"Song 4 Lovers" is a song by English-Irish pop band Liberty X, released as the lead single from their third studio album, X (2005). The song features uncredited vocals from Rev Run of Run-D.M.C. and was produced by Liberty X member Tony Lundon. The single was released on 26 September 2005 and peaked at  5 on the UK Singles Chart, becoming the band's highest-charting single from the album.

Background
The decision to feature Rev Run (Joseph Simmons), of the rap group Run DMC, was made by band member Tony Lundon, who produced the track whilst the band were recording their third studio album for the V2 Records label, which was later scrapped due to a dispute between the band and their management. The single was quickly picked up by Unique Corp, who chose to release it as an attempt to create a new direction for the band. The single was also successful in Australia, where it received an exclusive release on 3 October 2005.

Music video
The music video for the track was filmed in Amsterdam, Netherlands and in New York City, United States, and was directed by Bill Schacht for Aestheticom. The video features the band performing with a gospel choir inside a church, as well as on the rooftop of a skyline building, intercut with scenes of Rev. Run performing his vocals to a group of youths on the streets of New York, as well as following the story of a woman who goes into labour whilst she is asleep. The video reached No. 2 on The Box in the United Kingdom, and No. 4 on MTV, with heavy airplay on all of the major music channels for over three months after its premiere. The video features on the physical version of the single, as well as appearing on the bonus DVD issued with X in Australia.

Track listings

 UK CD1
 "Song 4 Lovers" (single version) – 3:29
 "Yo DJ" (album version) – 3:21

 UK CD2
 "Song 4 Lovers" (radio edit) – 3:00
 "Song 4 Lovers" (full length version) – 4:19
 "Song 4 Lovers" (Fray Urban remix) – 4:00
 "Song 4 Lovers" (video) – 3:00

 Australian CD single
 "Song 4 Lovers" (full length Version) – 4:19
 "Song 4 Lovers" (Fray Urban remix) – 4:00
 "Yo DJ" (album version) – 3:21
 "Song 4 Lovers" (Solaris 12-inch club mix) – 7:37
 "Song 4 Lovers" (Red Rhythm mix) – 3:17

Charts

Weekly charts

Year-end charts

Release history

References

2005 singles
2005 songs
Big Records singles
Films shot in Amsterdam
Films shot in New York City
Liberty X songs
Virgin Records singles